Henning Löhlein, (born 1965, in Germany) is an illustrator working in Bristol.
His work has appeared in many media outlets including The Guardian, The Observer, The Financial Times and he has illustrated over thirty books so far.
He has drawn his distinctive illustrations for authors of children's books from Britain and Germany, including Werner Holzwarth, Katja Reider, Manfred Mai, Gudrun Pausewang.
Since 1996 he has been selected every year for the exhibition of the German Cartoon Prize.

Early life and career
Henning Löhlein grew up in Bonn, Germany, studied three years art In the South of France, before coming to Bristol on an Erasmus exchange, where he finished his studies in illustration, before doing an MA at Brighton University in sequential illustration.

Illustrated children's books

My Name is Mr Fox
by Shen Roddie
Macmillan Publishers

Ringo Rabe traut sich was
by Manfred Mai
Ravensburger Buchverlag

Kleeorg und Kleeopatra
by Werner Holzwarth
Bajazzo

Die Oma im Drachenbauch
by Gudrun Pausewang
Gerstenberg Verlag

Dein kleiner Kummerkiller
by Katja reider
Hoffmann und Campe

Ganz schön schlau die dumme Sau
by Werner Holzwarth
terzio Verlag

Harry, Rabbit on the Run
by Adam Frost
Macmillan Children's Books

Ralph the Magic Rabbit
by Adam Frost
Macmillan Children's Books

Die Weihnachtshäsin
von Adriana Dorsett
Hoffmann und Campe

External links
The Guardian "Reading with kids", 22 October 2011
BuchMarkt Heft 3 / 2012
Portrait of the artist Eselsohr 04/2012
http://www.lohlein.com

1965 births
Living people
German illustrators
Artists from Bonn
Date of birth missing (living people)